Strawberry Moon is a jazz album by Grover Washington Jr. It was released in 1987 through Columbia Records, catalog 40510.  The album was self-produced by Grover Washington Jr, except for two tracks.  The first of these, "Summer Nights," was co- produced with Marcus Miller and was released as a single, reaching #35 in the Billboard R&B Charts.  The second, "I Will Be Here for You," was co-produced by Washington and Michael J. Powell.

Reception
A reviewer of Jet commented "The smash album featuring the new hit single "The Look of Love," with vocals of Jean Carne". Scott Yanow of AllMusic wrote "Grover Washington, Jr.'s first album in three years (and debut for Columbia) did not yield any major hits but found him playing in prime form".

Track listing
 "Strawberry Moon" (Washington) – 4:26
 "The Look of Love" (Burt Bacharach, Hal David) – 4:40
 "Shivaree Ride" (Washington) – 4:45
 "Caught a Touch of Your Love" (James Best, Craig Bickhardt, Jack Keller) – 5:11
 "Maddie's Blues" (Alf Clausen) – 2:47
 "I Will Be Here for You" (Steve George, John Lang, Richard Page) – 5:33
 "Monte Carlo Nights" (Todd Cochran, Stix Hooper) – 5:53
 "Keep in Touch" (Gary Taylor) – 4:27
 "Summer Nights" (Marcus Miller) – 6:29

Personnel 
 Grover Washington Jr. – alto saxophone, soprano saxophone, tenor saxophone, Fender Rhodes, Fairlight CMI
 James K. Lloyd – grand piano, Fender Rhodes, Yamaha DX7, Fairlight CMI 
 James Simmons – Fairlight CMI (5)
 Joey DeFrancesco – grand piano (8), Fender Rhodes (8)
 Marcus Miller – multi instruments (9)
 Richard Steacker – guitars (1, 2, 3, 5, 7, 8)
 B.B. King – guitar (4), lead vocals (4)
 Michael J. Powell – guitars (6)
 Gerald Veasley – 5-string bass (1, 3, 4, 6, 7, 8)
 Tyrone Brown – electric upright bass (2, 5)
 Darryl Washington – drums (1-8), timbales (9)
 Jim Salamone – LinnDrum (1, 3), percussion (1, 3)
 Ellen Cohen – bell tree (1), wind chimes (1)
 Leonard Gibbs – congas (1-8), percussion (2, 4-8)
 Jean Carne – lead vocals (2, 8)
 Spencer Harrison – lead vocals (7), backing vocals (7, 8)
 Liz Hogue – backing vocals (7, 8)

Production 
 Grover Washington Jr. – producer, mixing  
 Michael J. Powell – co-producer (6)
 Marcus Miller – co-producer (9), mixing (9)
 George Butler – executive producer 
 Peter Humphreys – engineer (1-8), mixing (1-8)
 Tim Kinsey – engineer (4)
 Eric Calvi – engineer (9)
 Michael O'Reilly – engineer (9)
 Randy Abrams – assistant engineer (1-8)
 Ronnie James – assistant engineer (1-8)
 Scott MacMinn – assistant engineer (1-8)
 Armand Pocoroba – assistant engineer (1-8)
 Dave Saia – assistant engineer (1-8)
 Adam Silverman – assistant engineer (1-8)
 Nelson Ayers – assistant engineer (9)
 Chaz Clifton – assistant engineer (9)
 Dan Grigsby – assistant engineer (9)
 Neil Nappe – assistant engineer (9)
 Jim Regan – assistant engineer (9)
 Nimitr Sarkananda – mastering 
 Christopher Austopchuk – art direction, design 
 Jennifer Baumann – photography

Studios
 Recorded at Sigma Sound Studios (Philadelphia, PA); Counterpoint Studios (New York, NY); House of Music (West Orange, NJ); Dallas Sound Lab (Irving, TX).
 Tracks 1-8 mixed at Sigma Sound Studios; Track 9 mixed at A & R Recording (New York, NY).
 Mastered at Masterwork Recording (Philadelphia, PA).

Charts

References

Grover Washington Jr. albums
1987 albums
Albums produced by Marcus Miller
Columbia Records albums